LaMetta Wynn (August 4, 1933 – June 24, 2021) was the mayor of Clinton, Iowa from 1995 to 2007. She was the first African-American woman to hold the position of mayor in any Iowa municipality.

Wynn has 10 children and worked for 30 years as a registered nurse. She graduated from Galena High School in Galena, Illinois. Prior to becoming mayor, Wynn served 12 years on the Clinton School Board.

On January 26, 2006, Wynn announced her candidacy for the Iowa Senate, District 13 as a Republican, but lost the election to incumbent Democrat Roger Stewart.

References

1933 births
2021 deaths
Mayors of places in Iowa
21st-century American women politicians
Women mayors of places in Iowa
Iowa Republicans
Politicians from Clinton, Iowa
African-American people in Iowa politics
African-American mayors in Iowa
20th-century African-American politicians
20th-century African-American women
21st-century African-American politicians
21st-century African-American women
American women nurses
School board members in Iowa
African-American nurses
People from Galena, Illinois
20th-century American women politicians
20th-century American politicians
21st-century American politicians
African-American women mayors